is a Japanese politician of the Liberal Democratic Party, a member of the House of Representatives in the Diet (national legislature). A native of Higashimurayama, Tokyo and graduate of Nihon University, he had served in the assembly of Tokyo since 1993. He 
was elected to the House of Representatives for the first time in 2005 after an unsuccessful run in 2003.

References

External links 
 Official website in Japanese.

1947 births
Living people
People from Higashimurayama, Tokyo
Nihon University alumni
Koizumi Children
Members of the House of Representatives (Japan)
Liberal Democratic Party (Japan) politicians